Kazuń Nowy  is a village in the administrative district of Gmina Czosnów, within Nowy Dwór County, Masovian Voivodeship, in east-central Poland.

The village has an approximate population of 500.

References

Villages in Nowy Dwór Mazowiecki County